Frédéric Vichot (born 1 May 1959 in Valay) is a French former professional road bicycle racer, who won one stage in the Vuelta a España and two stages in the Tour de France. He is the uncle of racing cyclist Arthur Vichot.

Major results

1979
 1st Stage 3b Tour de Liège
1980
 1st Overall Circuit des Mines
1st Stage 3
 1st Stage 3 Étoile des Espoirs
 1st Stage 4 Route de France
 9th Overall Tour de l'Avenir
1981
 1st Stage 12 Vuelta a España
1982
 6th Overall Étoile des Espoirs
1983
 1st Stage 3 Tour de l'Avenir
1984
 1st Stage 15 Tour de France
 2nd GP Ouest–France
 5th Overall Critérium International
 7th Overall Paris–Nice
 7th Amstel Gold Race
 8th Overall Route du Sud
1985
 1st Stage 16 Tour de France
 2nd Grand Prix de Cannes
 3rd Overall Paris–Nice
 3rd Overall Route du Sud
 10th Züri-Metzgete
 10th Overall Tour Méditerranéen
1987
 2nd Grand Prix de Cannes
 5th Overall Étoile de Bessèges
1989
 10th Paris–Brussels
1990
 2nd Overall Route du Sud
 9th Giro dell'Etna
1992
 6th Overall Tour de Luxembourg

Grand Tour general classification results timeline

References

External links 

French male cyclists
1959 births
Living people
French Tour de France stage winners
French Vuelta a España stage winners
Sportspeople from Haute-Saône
Cyclists from Bourgogne-Franche-Comté
21st-century French people
20th-century French people